Neisseria sigma-E sRNA (NSE sRNA) is a non-coding RNA found in the bacterial genus Neisseria, including the two pathogens N. meningitidis and N. gonorrhoeae. The RNA was discovered in a screen for genes differentiated by high expression of the Sigma factor, sigma E. Seven genes were predicted to be regulated by NSE sRNA, including fur, nadC and a putative TetR family transcriptional regulator, through base-pairing interactions with the 5' UTR. The sRNA transcript is terminated by a rho independent terminator.

See also:
 NrrF sRNA
 Neisseria RNA thermometers
 Neisseria sibling sRNAs NmsR/RcoF

References 

RNA